Radhanpur railway station is a railway station in Patan district, Gujarat, India on the Western line of the Western Railway network. One Passenger, two Express, and two Superfast trains halt here.

Nearby Stations 

Piplee is the nearest railway station towards , whereas Devgam is the nearest railway station towards .

Major trains

Following Express and Superfast trains halt at Radhanpur railway station in both direction:

 22483/84 Gandhidham–Jodhpur Express
 12959/60 Dadar–Bhuj Superfast Express
 19151/52 Palanpur–Bhuj Intercity Express
 14321/22 Ala Hazrat Express (via Bhildi)

References 

Railway stations in Patan district
Ahmedabad railway division